A roller coaster is a type of amusement ride.

Roller coaster may also refer to:

Roller coasters
Roller Coaster (Dai Nam Van Hien), a steel roller coaster in Bình Dương, Vietnam
Roller Coaster (Dam Sen Park), a steel roller coaster in Ho Chi Minh City, Vietnam
Roller Coaster (Great Yarmouth Pleasure Beach), a wooden roller coaster in Great Yarmouth UK
Roller Coaster (Lagoon), a wooden roller coaster in Farmington, Utah, US
Roller Coaster (Suoi Tien Park), a steel roller coaster in Ho Chi Minh City, Vietnam
The Roller Coaster, a steel roller coaster at the New York-New York Hotel & Casino on the Las Vegas Strip

Film and television
Rollercoaster (1977 film), a film by James Goldstone
Rollercoaster (1999 film), a film by Scott Smith
Rollercoaster (TV series), a 2005–2010 Australian children's show
"Rollercoaster" (Phineas and Ferb), a 2007 television episode or its 2011 musical version, "Rollercoaster: The Musical"

Music
Rollercoaster (Australian festival), an annual music festival

Albums
Rollercoaster (Jim Verraros album), 2005
Rollercoaster (Let Loose album) or the title song, 1996
Rollercoaster (Randy Rogers Band album), 2004
Roller Coaster (Red Bacteria Vacuum album) or the title song, 2006
Roller Coaster (Scott Cain album) or the title song, 2004
Rollercoaster (soundtrack) or the title track, from the 1977 film, by Lalo Schifrin
Rollercoaster (EP) or the title song, by The Jesus and Mary Chain, 1990
Red House Painters (Rollercoaster) or the title song, by Red House Painters, 1993
Rollercoaster, by the Adicts, 2004

Songs
"Rollercoaster" (B*Witched song), 1998
"Roller Coaster" (Chungha song), 2018
"Rollercoaster" (Dolly Style song), 2016
"Roller Coaster" (Erika Jayne song), 2007
"Rollercoaster" (Julian Le Play song), 2014
"Roller Coaster" (Justin Bieber song), 2013
"Roller Coaster" (Luke Bryan song), 2014
"Roller Coaster" (Toni Braxton and Babyface song), 2014
"Roller Coaster", by the 13th Floor Elevators from The Psychedelic Sounds of the 13th Floor Elevators, 1966
"Rollercoaster", by Best Coast from Always Tomorrow, 2020
"Rollercoaster", by Black Mountain from Wilderness Heart, 2010
"Rollercoaster", by Bleachers from Strange Desire, 2014
"Roller Coaster", by Blink-182 from Take Off Your Pants and Jacket, 2001
"Roller Coaster", by Bon Jovi from This House Is Not for Sale, 2016
"Roller Coaster", by Exo-XC from What a Life, 2019
"Rollercoaster", by the Grid from Evolver, 1994
"Rollercoaster", by Machine Gun Fellatio from Paging Mr Strike, 2003
"Rollercoaster", by Janet Jackson from Discipline, 2008
"Rollercoaster", by the Jonas Brothers from Happiness Begins, 2019
"Rollercoaster", by Sleater-Kinney from The Woods, 2005
"Roller Coaster", by TXT from The Dream Chapter: Magic, 2019
"Rollercoaster", from the Phineas and Ferb episode "Rollercoaster: The Musical!", 2011
"Rollercoaster", by Josh Panda which represented Vermont in the American Song Contest

Other uses
"Roller Coaster" (game) or "Down Down Baby", a song and clapping game
Roller Coaster (video game), a 1985 video game
Operation Roller Coaster, a series of nuclear tests carried out at the NTS, 1963

See also
"Love Rollercoaster", a 1975 song by The Ohio Players
RollerCoaster Tycoon (series), a trilogy of video games